Gustavo Cesar Rodrigues (born 9 April 1995) is a Brazilian handball player for Chambéry Savoie Handball and the Brazilian national team.

He represented Brazil at the 2019 World Men's Handball Championship.

References

External links

1995 births
Living people
Brazilian male handball players
Expatriate handball players
Brazilian expatriate sportspeople in France
Brazilian expatriate sportspeople in Portugal
Handball players from São Paulo
Handball players at the 2020 Summer Olympics
21st-century Brazilian people